or  or  is a village in the municipality of Hamarøy in Nordland county, Norway.

Drag is located along Norwegian National Road 827 which runs through Drag to a ferry port that connects to the village of Kjøpsvik across the fjord. Árran, the national Lule Sami Center is located in Drag. The Drag/Helland Church is located just outside the village of Drag.

References

Hamarøy
Villages in Nordland
Populated places of Arctic Norway